, ("System for IDs and names of places") or SIMC, is a Polish government scheme to create unique identifiers for places.

SIMC is a registry of names of places and their constituent parts, including the following information:

 The official name of the village
 ID of the village
 the type locality
 parent village commune, district and province
 SIMC ID with check digit

SIMC IDs and place names are updated on a regular basis after changes of official names of places and changes in the basic territorial divisions of the state. SIMC IDs are unique and permanent.

References

External links 

 Description of the structure SIMC

1998 establishments in Poland
Identifiers